Cotesia is a genus of braconid wasps first described by Peter Cameron in 1891. Some species parasitize caterpillars of species considered pests, and are used as biocontrol agents. Cotesia congregata parasitizes the tomato and the tobacco hornworms. C. glomerata and C. rubecula feed on the cabbage white and other white butterfly caterpillars. C. gonopterygis and C. risilis are host-specific and parasitize the common brimstone.

The wasp C. melanoscelus parasitizes the caterpillar of the spongy moth. It, and the spongy moth, are native to Europe. The spongy moth is an invasive species in North America, and C. melanoscelus has been imported as a biocontrol of the moth. Cotesia icipe is a parasitoid of Spodoptera littoralis and beet armyworm (Spodoptera exigua) which are pests of amaranth crops.

Species
List of Cotesia species

See also
 List of Cotesia species

References

External links 
 Preliminary evolutionary relationships within the parasitoid wasp genus Cotesia

 Hymenoptera Institute. U. Kentucky

Microgastrinae
Braconidae genera
Articles containing video clips